Joaquin Orth (born 28 April 1955) is a Mexican equestrian. He competed in the individual dressage event at the 1996 Summer Olympics.

References

External links
 

1955 births
Living people
Mexican male equestrians
Mexican dressage riders
Olympic equestrians of Mexico
Equestrians at the 1996 Summer Olympics
Equestrians at the 1987 Pan American Games
Equestrians at the 2003 Pan American Games
Pan American Games bronze medalists for Mexico
Pan American Games medalists in equestrian
Place of birth missing (living people)
Medalists at the 1987 Pan American Games
Medalists at the 2003 Pan American Games